Illinois Route 175 was a state highway in Peoria County, Illinois during the 1930s.

Route description
The route was a short spur from U.S. Route 24 and Illinois Route 9 to the village of Glasford.

History
Route 175 was established in 1924 as part of the later series of State Bond Issue (SBI) Routes. It was decommissioned in the early 1930s, and by 1935 the road became unnumbered. To this day, County Road R33 still sits at this particular roadway.

Major intersections

References

1924 establishments in Illinois
1930s disestablishments
Transportation in Peoria County, Illinois
175